This is a list of the county governors of Troms county in Norway. The office of county governor is a government agency of the Kingdom of Norway.

In 1844, the Troms area were separated from Vardøhus amt to form the new Tromsø amt (county). For the first 22 years, the Tromsø and Vardøhus counties shared an amtmann. It wasn't until 1866 that Tromsø got its own county governor. In 1919, the name was changed to Troms fylke. From 1 January 2019 the county governor offices of Troms and Finnmark were merged in anticipation of the merger of the two counties.

From 1844 until 1918, the county was subordinate to the Diocesan Governor of Tromsø who was the civil governor of the Diocese of Tromsø.

The county governor is the government's representative in the county. The governor carries out the resolutions and guidelines of the Storting and government. This is done first by the county governor performing administrative tasks on behalf of the ministries. Secondly, the county governor also monitors the activities of the municipalities and is the appeal body for many types of municipal decisions.

Names
The name of the county (Tromsø or Troms) and the word for county (amt or fylke) have changed over time. From 1844 until 1918 the title was Amtmann i Tromsø amt. Since 1 Jan 1919, the title was Fylkesmann i Troms fylke.

List of county governors
Troms county has had the following governors:

References

Troms